Nacer Sandjak (born 2 July 1953) is an Algerian football manager and former player who manages MO Béjaïa.

Career
Born in Paris, Sandjak played club football in France for Romainville, Chatillon-sur-Seine and Noisy-le-Sec, as a midfielder and forward.

He has managed in France and Algeria with Noisy-le-Sec and JS Kabylie. He also managed the national team. He became manager of MO Béjaïa in June 2016, leaving that role in 2017. Sandjak had a brief spell as manager of Moroccan club Chabab Rif Al Hoceima during the last weeks of the 2017–18 Botola.

References

1953 births
Living people
Footballers from Paris
French footballers
Algerian footballers
French sportspeople of Algerian descent
Olympique Noisy-le-Sec players
Association football midfielders
Association football forwards
Algerian football managers
Algeria national football team managers
JS Kabylie managers
MO Béjaïa managers
2000 African Cup of Nations managers
21st-century Algerian people